Rajarshi Memorial Higher Secondary School Aloor (RMHSS Aloor) is an institution situated in Aloor, Thrissur District, India. It is a government aided Malayalam and English medium school. It comes under the jurisdiction of Irinjalakuda Educational District in Thrissur revenue district.

Courses Offered
Std V to X: English medium & Malayalam medium

Plus Two: Science (Biology, Maths, Phy, Che), Humanities (Economics, Politics), Commerce are the three streams available for higher secondary education here

History
The school was founded by Rev.Fr. Antony Pullockaran, in one acre donated by Sri. A.J. John Master who was teacher in Elinjipara School. Sri. A.j. John Master and the then Educational Director of the Cochin state Sri. I.M. Menon were classmates. On ground of this friendship I.M. Menon was instrumental in gaining official sanction from the Diwan of Kochi. He also took initiative to obtain furniture from the government to the school. As a result, the school was named after his father Sir Sri Rama Varma XV GCSI GCIE (1852–1932) popularly known as The Rajarshi Of Cochin and as Abdicated Highness, was the ruler of the Kingdom of Cochin from 1895 to 1914.

This Rajarshi Memorial High School became the first torch bearer of knowledge in the Aloor Grama Panchayath. The official functioning of the school started on 2 June 1942 with 90 students and three teacher. Sri. T.T. Vareed the first Headmaster was assisted by Sri. A.J. Joseph and Sri. A.C. Rappai.In 1948 first SSLC batch passed out. Gradually the number of students, and teachers increased. Being the pioneer education and this improving the literacy of the village which was once backward in literacy. As time passed the salary and day to day expenditure of the school shot up. 10 Rev.Fr. Antony Pullockaran registered the school in the name of the 11 existing staff for Rs.5500/- during 1949-50’s. This paved the way for the institution in becoming a staff Management School where the Headmaster and the manager became the same person. Sri. T.T. Vareed master was the first Headmaster-manager and Sri. V.J. Joseph master was the first Management secretary. The year 1998 witnessed yet another landmark in the history of the institution. Due to the strenuous efforts of the then Agricultural Minister Late Sri.V.K. Rajan, the school was upgraded as a Higher Secondary School. This institution was elevated on the first and prominent higher secondary school of Aloor Panchayath.

The school governing body consisted of H.M Manager and elected executive members from among the staff. When there was a steady increase in the members of teachers, this committee decided to make all the teachers on members in the school management. This was taken as an effective measure for the property and effective running of the institution along with the objective to protect and safeguard the interests of the teachers. Until this day the school functions as per these norms.

Roll of Honour

 Award of Malayala Manorama Nallapaadam in 2014 for being the best school in Thrissur district.
 State finalist of Malayala Manorama Nallapaadam in 2014
 The first state award of Mathrubhumi Nanma in 2015 for being the best school with social responsibility.
 State Award of Dept. of tourism, Government of Kerala-GKSF in 2016 
 Award of mathrubhumi seed for the best NAKSHATHRAVANAM ( Arboratum of Medicinal plants) in 2017.
Haritham award of AKSTU for the conservation of environment in 2018.

See also
 Rajarshi Memorial Higher Secondary School, Vadavucode

References 

High schools and secondary schools in Kerala
Schools in Thrissur district